"Cadillac Style" is a song written by Mark Petersen, and recorded by American country music artist Sammy Kershaw.  It was released in October 1991 as the lead single from his debut album Don't Go Near the Water. It peaked at number 3 on the country music charts in both the United States and Canada.

Content
The song's narrator says that he doesn't have a lot of nice things, but he says that "my little baby loves me Cadillac style".

Music video
The music video was directed by Steve Boyle.

Chart performance
"Cadillac Style" debuted at number 68 on the U.S. Billboard Hot Country Singles & Tracks for the week of October 12, 1991.

Year-end charts

References

1991 singles
1991 songs
Sammy Kershaw songs
Song recordings produced by Buddy Cannon
Song recordings produced by Norro Wilson
Mercury Nashville singles